"Feel Something" is a song by Dutch DJ and record producer Armin van Buuren, featuring vocals from Dutch singer Duncan Laurence. It was released as a digital download on 6 November 2020 by Armada Music as the fifth single from Laurence's debut studio album Small Town Boy. The song also features on Armin van Buuren's EP Euthymia.

Background
In an interview with Dutch radio station Qmusic, Laurence talked about how the collaboration with Van Buuren came about.

Personnel
Credits adapted from Tidal.
 Armin van Buuren – producer, composer
 Benno de Goeij – producer, composer
 Brett McLaughlin – composer
 Duncan de Moor – composer, lyricist, featured artist
 Jordan Palmer – composer
 Sydney Cubit – composer

Charts

References

2020 singles
2020 songs
Duncan Laurence songs
Armin van Buuren songs
Songs written by Armin van Buuren
Songs written by Leland (musician)
Songs written by Benno de Goeij
Songs written by Duncan Laurence